Charles Roux (22 April 1903 – 15 February 1995) was a French racing cyclist. He rode in the 1925 Tour de France.

References

External links
 

1903 births
1995 deaths
French male cyclists
Place of birth missing